UFC Fight Night: McDonald vs. Lineker (also known as UFC Fight Night 91) was a mixed martial arts event produced by the Ultimate Fighting Championship held on July 13, 2016, at Denny Sanford Premier Center in Sioux Falls, South Dakota.

Background
This was the first UFC event under the ownership of a group led by Endeavor which included Silver Lake Partners, Kohlberg Kravis Roberts, and MSD Capital; their purchase of Zuffa was announced two days earlier. The event also was the first that the organization has hosted in South Dakota.

A lightweight bout between The Ultimate Fighter winners was scheduled to headline the event, as The Ultimate Fighter: Team Lesnar vs. Team dos Santos winner Tony Ferguson was expected to face The Ultimate Fighter: Live winner Michael Chiesa. However, Chiesa pulled out due to a back injury on June 27. On the following day, it was announced that promotional newcomer Lando Vannata would replace him and the bout would be moved to the co-main event, as a bantamweight bout between former interim UFC Bantamweight Championship challenger Michael McDonald and John Lineker was revealed as the new headliner.

Alex White was expected to face The Ultimate Fighter: Team McGregor vs. Team Faber winner Ryan Hall, but pulled out on June 28 due to an undisclosed injury. Hall elected to fight on a different date rather than have the promotion find him a replacement.

Results

Bonus awards
The following fighters were awarded $50,000 bonuses:
Fight of the Night: Tony Ferguson vs. Lando Vannata
Performance of the Night: John Lineker and Louis Smolka

See also
List of UFC events
2016 in UFC

References

UFC Fight Night
Mixed martial arts in South Dakota
2016 in mixed martial arts
July 2016 sports events in the United States